Sssssss (released as Ssssnake in the United Kingdom and Japan) is a 1973 American horror film starring Strother Martin, Dirk Benedict and Heather Menzies. It was directed by Bernard L. Kowalski and written by Hal Dresner and Daniel C. Striepeke, the latter of whom also produced the film. The make-up effects were created by John Chambers and Nick Marcellino. It received a nomination for the Best Science Fiction Film award of the Academy of Science Fiction, Fantasy & Horror Films in 1975.

Plot
Dr. Carl Stoner, a herpetologist, sells a mysterious creature in a crate to a carnival owner. He later hires college student David Blake as an assistant, claiming that his previous assistant had left town to attend to a sick relative. Unbeknownst to David or anyone else, Stoner is a delusional man.

Stoner begins David on a course of injections, purportedly as a safeguard against being bitten by a snake in his lab. David's skin slowly starts to change and even peel like a snakeskin. He begins to have strange nightmares and goes into a coma when having dinner with Stoner, not waking up until a few days later. He also begins to lose weight, but Stoner tells him those are side effects from the venom. David begins a romance with Stoner's daughter Kristina, although her father objects and insists that she not have any sexual relations with him.

When David wakes up the next morning, he looks in the mirror and screams in horror. Later, a distraught David is in the lab, where Stoner gives him another injection. Meanwhile, Stoner's suspicious colleague, Dr. Daniels, arrives to inspect the property. Stoner attempts to hide David in a corner, but David gets enough strength to walk to a window, allowing Daniels to see that his face has become green and scaly. Before Daniels can react, Stoner knocks him out and feeds him to a python, and David collapses.

Kristina visits a carnival freak show and is horrified when she sees a bizarre "snake-man", whom she recognizes as Stoner's previous assistant. Distraught, she races back home to save David, who is currently mutating into a king cobra, brought about by Stoner's injections. Stoner is bitten by a real king cobra from his lab and dies, just as David's transformation is complete. Kristina arrives home and finds her father's body with the real cobra next to him. Growing suspicious, the police arrive and shoot the cobra before heading to the lab where a mongoose is attacking David's neck, attempting to kill him. But the police do not have a clear shot, and as Kristina screams David's name, the movie ends abruptly, leaving their fates uncertain.

Cast
 Strother Martin as Dr. Carl Stoner
 Dirk Benedict as David Blake
 Heather Menzies as Kristina Stoner
 Richard B. Shull as Dr. Ken Daniels
 Tim O'Connor as Kogen
 Jack Ging as Sheriff Dale Hardison
 Kathleen King as Kitty Stewart
 Reb Brown as Steve Randall
 Ted Grossman as Deputy Morgan Bock
 Charles Seel as Old Man (Oh Il-nam)
 Ray Ballard as Waggish Tourist
 Noble Craig as Tim McGraw, the Snake Man

Production

The film's executive producers were Richard Zanuck and David Brown, who went on to produce Jaws.

The venomous snakes in the film were not defanged during production. Five king cobras were imported from Thailand for this feature, ranging from 10 to 15 ft in length. They were recently caught in good health from the wild with full venom potency. The "Snake Park" milking scenes were real and meant to mimic what Bill Haast did at his Miami Serpentarium in Florida daily. About one ounce of venom was collected during each take with no harm to the snakes. A different cobra was used for each take. The filming of this part of the movie took most of a day, as the cobras spent most of their time trying to escape the fenced enclosure rather than rising up in the traditional cobra attack mode.

Home media
Sssssss remained unreleased on home video in the United States until 1997, when it was issued by MCA Universal. It also received VHS releases in Japan and Spain by CIC Video, under the titles Ssssnake and Sssilbido de Muerte, respectively.

The film made its DVD debut on 7 September 2004, via Universal, who would re-release the film three additional times in 2009, 2011 and 2014. The 2011 release was part of a four-film "Cult Horror Collection", with The Funhouse, Phantasm II and The Serpent and the Rainbow. A DVD was also released in Japan on 7 April 2010.

Sssssss received its first Blu-ray release on 26 April 2016, via Shout! Factory, which included new interviews with stars Dirk Benedict and Heather Menzies as bonus features. It also received a Blu-ray release in Australia on 1 February 2017, via Shock Entertainment.

Reception
Howard Thompson of The New York Times called the film "a ss-surprise. Were it not for the lurid, starkly flapping windup, this would be recommended in toto as a gripping, quietly imaginative hair-curler. It is the only movie fiction I have ever seen that sustains a scholarly, informative attitude toward the world of snakes. This aspect is fascinating and chilling, as a gentle old venom researcher, Strother Martin, putters around with cobras and pythons in a country lab." Gene Siskel of the Chicago Tribune gave the film 1.5 stars out of 4, writing, "Even after 40 years of improved film technology, the climactic scene in Sssssss fails to match the drama of that moment when Frankenstein's monster sits up on the table." Kevin Thomas of the Los Angeles Times called it "highly amusing and genuinely creepy," and praised the "spectacular makeup." Keith Alain of The Monthly Film Bulletin wrote that an "attractive streak of humour suggests in the early stages that Ssssnake may turn into a macabre little thriller on the lines of The Fly," and lamented that "parody is eventually jettisoned in favour of portentous horror ... The rather disparate and ludicrous plot is not made any smoother by Bernard L. Kowalski's direction, which manages to be lumberingly predictable even in its borrowings (the Freaks-ish sideshow sequences, for example)." Leonard Maltin gave the film three out of a possible four stars, praising the film's "exceptional" make-up effects.

Donald Guarisco from AllMovie gave the film a negative review. In his retrospective review he wrote, "Sssssss fails because it emulates the films that inspired it all too closely: the story moves forward at a laboriously slow pace, and its threadbare plot makes it all too easy for the viewer to pick apart its plot holes and implausible elements. To make matters worse, the characterizations and dialogue never rise above the level of a subpar comic book and the anticlimactic finale is likely to frustrate even the most patient viewer."

On Rotten Tomatoes, the film has an approval rating of 36% based on 11 reviews with an average rating of 4.1/10.

Accolades

See also
 List of American films of 1973
List of killer snake films

References

External links
 
 
 
 Sssssss at Cinema de Merde  
    

1973 films
1973 horror films
American body horror films
American natural horror films
American science fiction horror films
Films scored by Patrick Williams
Films about shapeshifting
Films about snakes
Films directed by Bernard L. Kowalski
Universal Pictures films
The Zanuck Company films
1970s English-language films
1970s American films